= Tara-Leigh McHugh =

Canadian kinesiologist

- Born: 1978 (age 47–48)

Academic background
- Education: BSc, Kinesiology, 2001, Dalhousie University; MSc, PhD, 2009, University of Saskatchewan
- Thesis: "A new view of body image": a school-based participatory action research project with young Aboriginal women (2008)

Academic work
- Institutions: University of Calgary; University of Alberta

Tara-Leigh Fleming McHugh (born 1978) is a Canadian kinesiologist. She is a Tier 1 Canada Research Chair in Gender Equity in Sport and Physical Activity at the University of Calgary. McHugh’s research is broadly focused on addressing gender equity in sport, and subsequently enhancing the experiences of women and youth in sport and physical activity.

== Early life and education ==
McHugh was born in 1978. She completed her Bachelor of Arts degree in kinesiology at Dalhousie University in 2001 and her Master's degree and PhD at the University of Saskatchewan. She then returned to Dalhousie for a post-doctoral fellowship at the Atlantic Health Promotion Research Centre.

== Career ==
Following her post-doctoral fellowship, McHugh joined the faculty at University of Alberta in 2009. In this role, she helped the university launch its newest certificate program in Aboriginal Sport, Recreation, and Community Development. Beyond her research with Canadian indigenous women, McHugh also studies body image experiences of young women. In her research, she focused on female elite athletes and their experiences before and after childbirth. In 2022, she identified a significant gap in support for athletes during and after pregnancy, as well as the impact this gap has on their careers.

In 2025, McHugh was appointed a Tier 1 Canada Research Chair in Gender Equity in Sport and Physical Activity at the University of Calgary.
